Utacapnia trava, the Yellowstone snowfly, is a species of small winter stonefly in the family Capniidae. It is found in North America.

References

Plecoptera
Articles created by Qbugbot
Insects described in 1965